Ash Robson (born 4 November 1995) is a rugby league footballer who plays as a  or  for the York City Knights in the Betfred Championship.

Background
Robson was born in Castleford, West Yorkshire, England.

Career
As a junior Robson played for York Acorn RLFC then signed for Castleford Tigers (Heritage № 957) with whom he made three first-team appearances in the 2015 season. His contract at Castleford was extended until the end of the 2017 season but a knee injury in a pre-season friendly caused him to miss the entire 2016 season. In January 2017 he signed a three-year deal with York.

References

External links
York City Knights profile
Cas Tigers profile

1995 births
Living people
Castleford Tigers players
English rugby league players
Rugby league fullbacks
Rugby league halfbacks
Rugby league players from Castleford
York City Knights players